Reston is a village located in the southeast of Scotland, in Berwickshire, Scottish Borders region. The village lies on the western bank of the Eye Water.

Location 
It is located on the East Coast Main Line railway, which runs between London King's Cross and Edinburgh Waverley. Reston was once the location of the railway station and junction between the Berwickshire Railway and the ECML. Both the Berwickshire Railway and Reston station closed in the 1960s. However the reopening of Reston station was approved and construction began in March 2021. A study published in 2013 proposed that  and  stations be reopened. Reston station re-opened on 23 May 2022 following completion of a £20m redevelopment.

The A1 (Great North Road) runs to the east of the village.

Population 
The current population is about 450.

See also
List of places in the Scottish Borders
List of places in East Lothian
List of places in Midlothian
List of places in West Lothian

References

External links

RCAHMS: Reston
Gazetteer for Scotland: Reston
History of Reston
Reston Congregational Church

Villages in the Scottish Borders